Marie Pauleen Luna Sotto (born Marie Pauleen Javier Luna; born November 10, 1988) is a Filipino actress and television personality. She appears on GMA Network, particularly as one of the regular hosts of the long-running Philippine variety show Eat Bulaga! where she portrays the child-woman character Baby Poleng.

Career
Luna began her show business career when she joined Eat Bulaga!'''s Little Miss Philippines talent contest in 1995 where she first met her future husband, Vic Sotto. She began acting at 13 years of age when she became a member of ABS-CBN Corporation's Star Magic Batch 11 in 2002, before transferring to GMA Network.

She played the role of Odessa in Etheria, the second installment of the Encantadia trilogy, and appeared in the second Koreanovela adaptation of GMA Network's Ako si Kim Samsoon. Following this, she appeared in Luna Mystika, starring Heart Evangelista. In 2009 she played with Dennis Trillo and Jennica Garcia in the romantic-comedy Adik Sa'Yo, and was later cast as the primary antagonist, Sofia Montemayor, in Ikaw Sana.

Luna plays Honey Toledo-Ferrer in the afternoon Philippine soap opera Trudis Liit.

In 2006, Luna was ranked number 9 in the FHM-Philippines list of sexiest women and was featured on the cover of the December 2006 issue of UNO magazine.

In 2020, she joined TV5 Network and formerly hosted Chika, Besh! with Kapamilya actresses Pokwang and Ria Atayde, until it was ended the following year, in 2021.

Personal life
By December 2011, Luna had begun dating her Eat Bulaga! co-host Vic Sotto after co-starring in Enteng ng Ina Mo, which he only confirmed in 2013. In September 2015, Sotto confirmed his engagement to Luna. The couple married on January 30, 2016 in Ayala Alabang, Muntinlupa.
On May 6, 2017, Sotto announced on Eat Bulaga! that he and Luna were expecting their first child together. On November 6, Vic Sotto announced on Eat Bulaga!'' that Pauleen had given birth to a girl.

Filmography

Television

Film

Concert

Awards and recognitions

Magazine appearances

References
Footnotes

External links

Profile on iGMA.tv
Pauleen Luna Pictures, Bio, and More at Celebritiesph.com

1988 births
Living people
Filipino child actresses
Filipino film actresses
Filipino television actresses
Participants in Philippine reality television series
People from Las Piñas
Actresses from Metro Manila
ABS-CBN personalities
Star Magic
Pauleen
GMA Network personalities
Filipino television variety show hosts